Gregorio Manuel Peralta (May 8, 1935 – October 3, 2001), better known as Gregorio "Goyo" Peralta, was a top Argentine boxer. Peralta enjoyed success as both a light heavyweight and a heavyweight, one of a select group Latin American Heavyweights to attain world-class status. (John Ruiz and later Andy Ruiz are the only Hispanics to be world Heavyweight champion in boxing history.) Greg Peralta was a popular performer during the 1950s, 1960s and 1970s.

Biography
Gregorio Peralta was born in San Juan. He later resided in the area of Rosario, in Santa Fe Province.

On April 5, 1958, he made his professional boxing debut, knocking out a rival (Rene Pereira) who had lost all fourteen of his bouts. Peralta's fourth-round knockout of Pereira was at the legendary Luna Park, in Buenos Aires.

Peralta won his first five fights by knockout, then went the ten round distance for the first time on September 6 of that same year, against Jose Angel Manzur, whom he outpointed over ten rounds in Montevideo, Uruguay. His first fight abroad had already been held, when he beat Marcelo Farias by a second-round knockout 35 days before, also at Montevideo.

On October 22, he and Manzur had a rematch, with the two boxers drawing (tying) after ten more rounds.

On March 31, 1959, Peralta suffered his first loss as a professional, a ten-round decision defeat to then reigning South American light heavyweight champion Luis Ignacio in São Paulo, Brazil in a non-title bout. Peralta had one loss and two draws in his next three fights, but then he returned to winning, when he avenged his defeat against Ignacio by knocking him out in three rounds, August 23 in Brazil.

After winning his next five fights, including four in Uruguay, Peralta faced Mauro Mina, in a widely expected light heavyweight bout between two South Americans. On June 15, 1960, Peralta was knocked out by Mina in eight rounds at Lima, Peru.

Peralta then won twelve and drew one of his next thirteen bouts. Among those were a ten-round decision in a rubber match with Manzur, and a four-round disqualification win over Aurelio Diaz. Peralta was given his first chance at winning a belt when he fought Jose Giorgetti, on August 4, 1962, at Mar del Plata for the Argentine Heavyweight title. He won the national belt by outpointing Giorgetti over twelve rounds, and then won fifteen more bouts in a row, for a total of 24 victories and one draw in twenty-five bouts.

Beats Pastrano

The biggest win of his career came during that streak, when he outpointed world light heavyweight champion Willie Pastrano over ten rounds at Miami, Florida on September 20, 1963 in a non-title bout. His first fight with Pastrano marked Peralta's United States debut as a professional boxer.

Pastrano – light heavyweight title 
Peralta's next fight, on November 15 of that year, was also his first bout at New York's Madison Square Garden. He beat future José Torres world championship challenger, Wayne Thornton, by a ten-round decision there. After two more wins, including another one over Thornton, Peralta was given a shot at Pastrano's world Light-Heavyweight title, on April 10, 1964 in New Orleans, Louisiana. Pastrano retained the championship with a sixth-round knockout in a fight that had different views from boxing magazines; while the general consensus is that Pastrano was actually winning the fight when it was stopped, Ring En Español actually claimed twenty years later that Peralta was hitting Pastrano and had him against the ropes when the referee intervened and raised Pastrano's arm as the fight's winner. The truth is a cut opened in the second Thornton fight re-opened during Peralta's challenge of Pastrano and the bout was, to some hastily, to others justifiably, halted.

Bonavena takes Argentine title
Peralta went on to win nine of his next ten fights, including a rematch victory over Mauro Mina, outpointed in ten rounds at Buenos Aires on September 19 of '64, before defending his Argentine Heavyweight title for the first time, and losing it, to Oscar Bonavena by a twelve-round decision on September 4, 1965 in Buenos Aires. They'd rematch four years later.

Peralta then went undefeated over his next 32 bouts, building a record of twenty nine wins and three draws, with seventeen knockouts over that span. Among the highlights of those thirty two bouts were three ninth round disqualifications in a row (over Ron Marsh on March 11, 1968, and two over Felipe Pablo Marich, on April 5 and April 20 of that same year), a ten-round decision over Ramon Rocha on August 23, and a draw in a non-title rematch with Bonavena, held on August 8, 1969.

Foreman

After the Bonavena rematch, he would face George Foreman, in a fight that was nationally televised in the United States, on February 16, 1970, once again at the Madison Square Garden.  His now fighting weight being around 
200 lbs, Peralta had left the light-heavyweight scene way back. 
Foreman was the rising ex-Olympic star and Peralta then ranked 9th world contender was predicted to be George's biggest test to date. Foreman held an aura as an awesome knockout artist but Peralta doggedly went ten full rounds with the future two time world Heavyweight champion. He lost a unanimous decision to Foreman. But Peralta won the crowds admiration for a gutsy good performance. He used his boxing skill and mobility to show Foreman was open to fast well placed counters and tended to somewhat unravel in the later part of matches. It's thought Ali studied this among other Foreman matches in his preparation the legendary 'Rumble in the Jungle' victory.

Peralta's next bout came when he beat future world Light Heavyweight title challenger Piero del Papa, by a fifth-round knockout on June 6 at Montevideo.

His next bout marked his European debut, when he defeated Herbert Wick, exactly sixteen days after the fight with del Papa, by a second-round knockout in Barcelona, Spain. Peralta had three consecutive bouts in Spain, winning each of by knockout.

Foreman rematch
After two more wins, he faced Foreman again, at Oakland, California, this time with the NABF's vacant regional Heavyweight title on the line. Once again, Peralta fought ten rounds with Foreman, but he was knocked out in the tenth, on May 10, 1971. His two Foreman matches are fine achievements.

Peralta then moved to Spain for a one year. With the exception of a victory over Gerhard Zech on December 3 over at Germany, Peralta fought nine of his next ten bouts in Spain. These included a ten-round win over perennial contender Jose Urtain on October 8, a win over Leroy Caldwell by a fourth-round knockout on February 2, 1972, and a ten-round decision loss to Bob Foster world Light Heavyweight title challenger Ray Anderson on June 9 of that same year.

Ron Lyle twice
After the loss to Anderson, Peralta would move again, this time to Germany, and he won his next six bouts by knockout. A loss to top world title contender Ron Lyle, however, took place on May 12, 1973 at Denver, Colorado. Peralta lost to Lyle by a ten-round decision.

Peralta won his next two bouts by knockout in Germany, and then in a rematch held Lyle to a ten-round draw in Frankfurt, Germany. Peralta aged 38 years retired for good after the match.

Gregorio Peralta had an admirable record. It contained 98 wins, 9 defeats and 9 draws as a professional boxer, with 60 knockout wins, which places him in the exclusive group of boxers that won fifty or more fights by knockout during their career.

He led a quiet life after retiring, dying on October 3, 2001.

Professional boxing record 

|-
| style="text-align:center;" colspan="8"|98 Wins (60 knockouts), 9 Losses (3 knockouts), 9 Draws
|-  style="text-align:center; background:#e3e3e3;"
|  style="border-style:none none solid solid; "|Res.
|  style="border-style:none none solid solid; "|Record
|  style="border-style:none none solid solid; "|Opponent
|  style="border-style:none none solid solid; "|Type
|  style="border-style:none none solid solid; "|RoundTime
|  style="border-style:none none solid solid; "|Date
|  style="border-style:none none solid solid; "|Location
|  style="border-style:none none solid solid; "|Notes
|- align=center
|style="background:#abcdef;"|Draw||98–9–9||align=left| Ron Lyle
|
|
|
|align=left|
|align=left|
|- align=center
|Win||98–9–8||align=left| Johnny Griffin
|
|
|
|align=left|
|align=left|
|- align=center
|Win||97–9–8||align=left| Billy Aird
|
|
|
|align=left|
|align=left|
|- align=center
|Loss||96–9–8||align=left| Ron Lyle
|
|
|
|align=left|
|align=left|
|- align=center
|Win||96–8–8||align=left| Ba Sounkalo
|
|
|
|align=left|
|align=left|
|- align=center
|Win||95–8–8||align=left| Ronnie Wright
|
|
|
|align=left|
|align=left|
|- align=center
|Win||94–8–8||align=left| Horst Benedens
|
|
|
|align=left|
|align=left|
|- align=center
|Win||93–8–8||align=left| Arno Prick
|
|
|
|align=left|
|align=left|
|- align=center
|Win||92–8–8||align=left| Conny Venselek
|
|
|
|align=left|
|align=left|
|- align=center
|Win||91–8–8||align=left| Bill Drover
|
|
|
|align=left|
|align=left|
|- align=center
|Loss||90–8–8||align=left| Ray Anderson
|
|
|
|align=left|
|align=left|
|- align=center
|Win||90–7–8||align=left| Willie Johnson
|
|
|
|align=left|
|align=left|
|- align=center
|Win||89–7–8||align=left| Leroy Caldwell
|
|
|
|align=left|
|align=left|
|- align=center
|Win||88–7–8||align=left| Vernon McIntosh
|
|
|
|align=left|
|align=left|
|- align=center
|Win||87–7–8||align=left| Rocky Campbell
|
|
|
|align=left|
|align=left|
|- align=center
|Win||86–7–8||align=left| Gerhard Zech
|
|
|
|align=left|
|align=left|
|- align=center
|Win||85–7–8||align=left| José Manuel Urtain
|
|
|
|align=left|
|align=left|
|- align=center
|Win||84–7–8||align=left| Danny Machado
|
|
|
|align=left|
|align=left|
|- align=center
|Win||83–7–8||align=left| Jesse Billy Crown
|
|
|
|align=left|
|align=left|
|- align=center
|Loss||82–7–8||align=left| George Foreman
|
|
|
|align=left|
|align=left|
|- align=center
|Win||82–6–8||align=left| Humberto Ghiotti
|
|
|
|align=left|
|align=left|
|- align=center
|Win||81–6–8||align=left| Alfredo Vogrig
|
|
|
|align=left|
|align=left|
|- align=center
|Win||80–6–8||align=left| Roger Tighe
|
|
|
|align=left|
|align=left|
|- align=center
|Win||79–6–8||align=left| Herbert Wick
|
|
|
|align=left|
|align=left|
|- align=center
|Win||78–6–8||align=left| Piero del Papa
|
|
|
|align=left|
|align=left|
|- align=center
|Loss||77–6–8||align=left| George Foreman
|
|
|
|align=left|
|align=left|
|- align=center
|style="background:#abcdef;"|Draw||77–5–8||align=left| Oscar Bonavena
|
|
|
|align=left|
|align=left|
|- align=center
|Win||77–5–7||align=left| José Menno
|
|
|
|align=left|
|align=left|
|- align=center
|Win||76–5–7||align=left| José Menno
|
|
|
|align=left|
|align=left|
|- align=center
|Win||75–5–7||align=left| Marcelo Garnica
|
|
|
|align=left|
|align=left|
|- align=center
|Win||74–5–7||align=left| René Sosa
|
|
|
|align=left|
|align=left|
|- align=center
|Win||73–5–7||align=left| Francisco Ramos
|
|
|
|align=left|
|align=left|
|- align=center
|Win||72–5–7||align=left| Hugo Daniele
|
|
|
|align=left|
|align=left|
|- align=center
|Win||71–5–7||align=left| Roberto Veliz
|
|
|
|align=left|
|align=left|
|- align=center
|Win||70–5–7||align=left| Dick Hall
|
|
|
|align=left|
|align=left|
|- align=center
|Win||69–5–7||align=left| Ramón Rocha
|
|
|
|align=left|
|align=left|
|- align=center
|Win||68–5–7||align=left| Miguel Angel Paez
|
|
|
|align=left|
|align=left|
|- align=center
|Win||67–5–7||align=left| Kurt Luedecke
|
|
|
|align=left|
|align=left|
|- align=center
|style="background:#abcdef;"|Draw||66–5–7||align=left| Vittorio Saraudi
|
|
|
|align=left|
|align=left|
|- align=center
|Win||66–5–6||align=left| Felipe Marich
|
|
|
|align=left|
|align=left|
|- align=center
|Win||65–5–6||align=left| Felipe Marich
|
|
|
|align=left|
|align=left|
|- align=center
|Win||64–5–6||align=left| Ron Marsh
|
|
|
|align=left|
|align=left|
|- align=center
|Win||63–5–6||align=left| Carlos Paez
|
|
|
|align=left|
|align=left|
|- align=center
|style="background:#abcdef;"|Draw||62–5–6||align=left| Chuck Leslie
|
|
|
|align=left|
|align=left|
|- align=center
|Win||62–5–5||align=left| Felipe Marich
|
|
|
|align=left|
|align=left|
|- align=center
|Win||61–5–5||align=left| Chuck Leslie
|
|
|
|align=left|
|align=left|
|- align=center
|Win||60–5–5||align=left| Justo Benitez
|
|
|
|align=left|
|align=left|
|- align=center
|Win||59–5–5||align=left| José Menno
|
|
|
|align=left|
|align=left|
|- align=center
|Win||58–5–5||align=left| René Sosa
|
|
|
|align=left|
|align=left|
|- align=center
|Win||57–5–5||align=left| Angel Ludueña
|
|
|
|align=left|
|align=left|
|- align=center
|Win||56–5–5||align=left| Hugo Daniele
|
|
|
|align=left|
|align=left|
|- align=center
|Win||55–5–5||align=left| Andrés Selpa
|
|
|
|align=left|
|align=left|
|- align=center
|Win||54–5–5||align=left| Hugo Daniele
|
|
|
|align=left|
|align=left|
|- align=center
|Win||53–5–5||align=left| Carlos Vazquez
|
|
|
|align=left|
|align=left|
|- align=center
|Win||52–5–5||align=left| Alberto Hergerseimer
|
|
|
|align=left|
|align=left|
|- align=center
|Win||51–5–5||align=left| Hugo Daniele
|
|
|
|align=left|
|align=left|
|- align=center
|Win||50–5–5||align=left| Carlos Paez
|
|
|
|align=left|
|align=left|
|- align=center
|Win||49–5–5||align=left| René Sosa
|
|
|
|align=left|
|align=left|
|- align=center
|Loss||48–5–5||align=left| Oscar Bonavena
|
|
|
|align=left|
|align=left|
|- align=center
|Win||48–4–5||align=left| René Sosa
|
|
|
|align=left|
|align=left|
|- align=center
|Win||47–4–5||align=left| Miguel Angel Paez
|
|
|
|align=left|
|align=left|
|- align=center
|Win||46–4–5||align=left| René Sosa
|
|
|
|align=left|
|align=left|
|- align=center
|style="background:#abcdef;"|Draw||45–4–5||align=left| Miguel Angel Paez
|
|
|
|align=left|
|align=left|
|- align=center
|Win||45–4–4||align=left| Lino Armenteros
|
|
|
|align=left|
|align=left|
|- align=center
|Win||44–4–4||align=left| Aníbal Córdoba
|
|
|
|align=left|
|align=left|
|- align=center
|Win||43–4–4||align=left| Mauro Mina
|
|
|
|align=left|
|align=left|
|- align=center
|Win||42–4–4||align=left| Pablo Sagrispanti
|
|
|
|align=left|
|align=left|
|- align=center
|Win||41–4–4||align=left| Juan Morales
|
|
|
|align=left|
|align=left|
|- align=center
|Win||40–4–4||align=left| Roberto Davila
|
|
|
|align=left|
|align=left|
|- align=center
|Loss||39–4–4||align=left| Willie Pastrano
|
|
|
|align=left|
|align=left|
|- align=center
|Win||39–3–4||align=left| Wayne Thornton
|
|
|
|align=left|
|align=left|
|- align=center
|Win||38–3–4||align=left| Telmo Gonzalez
|
|
|
|align=left|
|align=left|
|- align=center
|Win||37–3–4||align=left| Wayne Thornton
|
|
|
|align=left|
|align=left|
|- align=center
|Win||36–3–4||align=left| Willie Pastrano
|
|
|
|align=left|
|align=left|
|- align=center
|Win||35–3–4||align=left| Telmo Gonzalez
|
|
|
|align=left|
|align=left|
|- align=center
|Win||34–3–4||align=left| Justo Benitez
|
|
|
|align=left|
|align=left|
|- align=center
|Win||33–3–4||align=left| Justo Benitez
|
|
|
|align=left|
|align=left|
|- align=center
|Win||32–3–4||align=left| Guillermo Dutschmann
|
|
|
|align=left|
|align=left|
|- align=center
|Win||31–3–4||align=left| Justo Benitez
|
|
|
|align=left|
|align=left|
|- align=center
|Win||30–3–4||align=left| Alfredo Yacanto
|
|
|
|align=left|
|align=left|
|- align=center
|Win||29–3–4||align=left| Pablo Sagrispanti
|
|
|
|align=left|
|align=left|
|- align=center
|Win||28–3–4||align=left| Jorge Tissera
|
|
|
|align=left|
|align=left|
|- align=center
|Win||27–3–4||align=left| Rodolfo Diaz
|
|
|
|align=left|
|align=left|
|- align=center
|Win||26–3–4||align=left| Justo Benitez
|
|
|
|align=left|
|align=left|
|- align=center
|Win||25–3–4||align=left| Justo Benitez
|
|
|
|align=left|
|align=left|
|- align=center
|Win||24–3–4||align=left| José Giorgetti
|
|
|
|align=left|
|align=left|
|- align=center
|Win||23–3–4||align=left| Antonio Diaz
|
|
|
|align=left|
|align=left|
|- align=center
|Win||22–3–4||align=left| Carlos Paiva
|
|
|
|align=left|
|align=left|
|- align=center
|Win||21–3–4||align=left| José Giorgetti
|
|
|
|align=left|
|align=left|
|- align=center
|Win||20–3–4||align=left| Andres Villalba
|
|
|
|align=left|
|align=left|
|- align=center
|Win||19–3–4||align=left| Aurelio Diaz
|
|
|
|align=left|
|align=left|
|- align=center
|Win||18–3–4||align=left| Pablo Sagrispanti
|
|
|
|align=left|
|align=left|
|- align=center
|Win||17–3–4||align=left| José Angel Mazur
|
|
|
|align=left|
|align=left|
|- align=center
|Win||16–3–4||align=left| Antonio Diaz
|
|
|
|align=left|
|align=left|
|- align=center
|style="background:#abcdef;"|Draw||15–3–4||align=left| Antonio Diaz
|
|
|
|align=left|
|align=left|
|- align=center
|Win||15–3–3||align=left| Pablo Sagrispanti
|
|
|
|align=left|
|align=left|
|- align=center
|Win||14–3–3||align=left| Ricardo Gonzalez
|
|
|
|align=left|
|align=left|
|- align=center
|Win||13–3–3||align=left| Carloz Vazquez
|
|
|
|align=left|
|align=left|
|- align=center
|Win||12–3–3||align=left| Hector Wilson
|
|
|
|align=left|
|align=left|
|- align=center
|Loss||11–3–3||align=left| Mauro Mina
|
|
|
|align=left|
|align=left|
|- align=center
|Win||11–2–3||align=left| Juan Carlos Comini
|
|
|
|align=left|
|align=left|
|- align=center
|Win||10–2–3||align=left| Jovito Arregui
|
|
|
|align=left|
|align=left|
|- align=center
|Win||9–2–3||align=left| Andrés Villalba
|
|
|
|align=left|
|align=left|
|- align=center
|Win||8–2–3||align=left| Aurelio Diaz
|
|
|
|align=left|
|align=left|
|- align=center
|Win||7–2–3||align=left| Luis Ignacio
|
|
|
|align=left|
|align=left|
|- align=center
|style="background:#abcdef;"|Draw||6–2–3||align=left| Aurelio Diaz
|
|
|
|align=left|
|align=left|
|- align=center
|Loss||6–2–2||align=left| Justo Benitez
|
|
|
|align=left|
|align=left|
|- align=center
|style="background:#abcdef;"|Draw||6–1–2||align=left| Aurelio Diaz
|
|
|
|align=left|
|align=left|
|- align=center
|Loss||6–1–1||align=left| Luis Ignacio
|
|
|
|align=left|
|align=left|
|- align=center
|style="background:#abcdef;"|Draw||6–0–1||align=left| José Angel Mazur
|
|
|
|align=left|
|align=left|
|- align=center
|Win||6–0||align=left| José Angel Mazur
|
|
|
|align=left|
|align=left|
|- align=center
|Win||5–0||align=left| Justo Benitez
|
|
|
|align=left|
|align=left|
|- align=center
|Win||4–0||align=left| Marcelo Farias
|
|
|
|align=left|
|align=left|
|- align=center
|Win||3–0||align=left| Julio Buffi
|
|
|
|align=left|
|align=left|
|- align=center
|Win||2–0||align=left| Tomas Lenning
|
|
|
|align=left|
|align=left|
|- align=center
|Win||1–0||align=left| Rene Pereyra
|
|
|
|align=left|
|align=left|

Exhibition boxing record

See also
List of Argentines

References

External links
 

1935 births
2001 deaths
People from San Juan, Argentina
Argentine male boxers
Heavyweight boxers
Sportspeople from San Juan Province, Argentina